True Stories is a 2016 studio album by The Rippingtons.

Track listing
All music written by Russ Freeman, except Track 4 written by Russ Freeman and Yaredt Leon.

"Wild Tales" - 4:30
"Sundance" - 4:18
"Flamenco Beach" - 4:19
"My Promise to You" - 4:06
"Reach Higher" - 4:20
"Dreamcatcher" - 3:32
"Wonderland" - 4:34
"Kings Road" - 4:02
"Golden Child" - 3:49
"True Stories" - 4:30

Personnel 
 Russ Freeman – keyboards, guitars, bass (1, 2, 4, 6-10), pedal steel guitar (2, 7, 9, 10), percussion (2, 3, 4), classical guitar (3)
 Rico Belled – Rhodes (5),  bass (5)
 Dave Karasony – drums (1, 2, 4-10), timbales (1), tambourine (2), percussion (6, 8)
 Brandon Fields – saxophone (1, 2, 5, 6, 8, 9), soprano saxophone (10)
 Jeffrey Osborne – vocals (4)

Production 
 Russ Freeman – producer, arrangements recording, mixing
 Andi Howard – executive producer, management
 Scott Witherspoon – vocal recording (4)
 Bernie Grundman – mastering 
 Sean Marlowe – art direction, design 
 Bill Mayer – cover art illustration 
Studios
 Recorded and Mixed at Surfboard Studios (Marina del Rey, CA).
 Drums recorded at Midas Studios (Los Angeles, CA).
 Mastered at Bernie Grundman Mastering (Hollywood, CA).

The Rippingtons albums
2016 albums